"Sam" is a song performed by Australian singer Olivia Newton-John. It was written by Don Black, Hank Marvin and John Farrar.

"Sam" was released in January 1977 as the third and final single from the Newton-John's eighth studio album, Don't Stop Believin' and peaked in the U.S. at number one on the Easy Listening chart and number twenty on the Hot 100. It reached number six in the UK Singles Chart.

Reception
Cash Box magazine said "The lovely Ms. Newton-John delivers a pop/easy listening ballad from her Don't Stop Believin' album, and the song, co-written by producer John Farrar, is well-tailored to her vocal style. The appropriate stations should catch on shortly."

Charts

Weekly charts

Year-end charts

See also
 List of number-one adult contemporary singles of 1977 (U.S.)

References

External links
 

1977 singles
Olivia Newton-John songs
Irish Singles Chart number-one singles
Songs with lyrics by Don Black (lyricist)
MCA Records singles
Songs written by John Farrar
1977 songs
Songs written by Hank Marvin